Barzakh (Arabic: برزخ, from Persian Barzakh, "limbo, barrier, partition") is an Arabic word meaning "obstacle", "hindrance", "separation", or "barrier". In Islam, it denotes a place separating the living from the hereafter or a phase/"stage" between an individual's death and their resurrection in "the Hereafter".

Some scholars believe that good Muslims will have a heavenly experience during this time, and sinners will experience suffering; while some Shia scholars believe the experience will not be like the physical pain or pleasure of the temporal world.

Scholars have different definitions of Barzakh. According to Ghazali, Barzakh may be the place for those who go neither to hell nor to heaven. According to Ibn Hazm, Barzakh is also the place for unborn souls, which are elsewhere described as residing in the lowest of the seven heavens, where an angel blows them into the wombs of women.

Etymology 
The Arabic word Barzakh is derived from the Middle Persian Barzag, "barrier, partition", which in turn can be traced back to the Parthian combination burz+ax(v) ("high existence"), similar to the Persian word for hell, dūzakh < dūž+ax(v) ("evil existence").

Quran and hadith 
Mentioned only three times in the Quran, and just once specifically as the barrier between the corporeal and ethereal, Barzakh is portrayed as a place in which, after death, the spirit is separated from the body – freed to contemplate the wrongdoing of its former life. Despite the gain of recognizance, it cannot utilize action. The other two occurrences refer to Barzakh as an impenetrable barrier between fresh and salt water. While fresh and salt water may intermingle, an ocean remains distinct from a river.

In hadith, Ibn al-Qayyim cites that, albeit not mentioned in the Quran, souls in Al-Barzakh would be grouped with others matching in purity or impurity.

Significance of body and soul separation 
In Islam, the soul and the body are independent of each other. This is significant in Barzakh, because only a person's soul goes to Barzakh and not their physical body. Since one's soul is divorced from their body in Barzakh, the belief is that no progress or improvements to one's past life can be made. If a person experienced a life of sin and worldly pleasures, one cannot try to perform good deeds in order to reach Jannah. Whatever one does in his or her lifetime is final and cannot be changed or altered in Barzakh. However, there is belief that the fire which represents the own bad deeds can already be seen in Barzakh, and that the spiritual pain caused by this can lead to purification of the soul.

Interpretations 
In mainstream Sunni and Shia Islam, Barzakh has been defined as "an intermediary stage between this life and another life in the Hereafter"; "an interval or a break between individual death and resurrection"; "The Stage Between this World and the Hereafter"; the period between a person's death and his resurrection on the Day of Resurrection.
Based in least in part on the verse "Before them is a Partition till the Day they are raised up." (Q.23:100) Some scholars believe  that good Muslims will have a heavenly experience during this time, and sinners will experience suffering; while some Shia scholars believe there is no experience of physical pain or pleasure in Barzakh.

Mainstream scholarly discourse 
Some Muslim scholars stress the importance of Barzakh, while others simply ignore it.

 Modern Muslim thinkers de-emphasize Barzakh, and focus instead on a person's individual life and the Day of Judgment. In this view, the state of Barzakh is simply looked past and skipped once a person dies.
 Muslim scholars who do believe in Barzakh still have varying interpretations of this intermediate state based on different traditions. Some traditions suggest that a person's deeds in their life will affect their experience in Barzakh. In these traditions, the state known as "Azaabul-Qabr," will be one where a person is punished for his or her deeds in their past life. While those in a second state known as "Tan'eemu Ahlit-Taa'ah Fil Qabr,"  will receive the blessings and bounties of Allah because of his or her faith and good deeds. Other traditions suggest that people in Barzakh are given temporary bodies. In this view, a person is either given a bright body or a dark body. These bodies are believed to be prepared from either the light or darkness of their deeds. If a person is given a bright body then this indicates that a person will go to heaven, while a dark body represents hell. In these traditions, Muslim scholars believe that once a person is given their body in Barzakh, they will already know their fate for the Day of Judgment. It is worth noting that in these traditions where Muslim scholars believe in Barzakh, they are basically saying that a person will be familiar with his or her fate prior to the Day of Judgment. This is based on what a person experiences in this intermediate state.
Al-Ghazālī states, "After the First Blast, all created beings shall abide for forty (it is unknown if it is a year or month or etc.) in the Intermediate Realm barzakh. Then shall God quicken Seraphiel, and command him to deliver the Second Blast, as He has said (Exalted is He!): Then shall it be blown again, and lo! they stand, beholding : they shall be on their feet, watching the Resurrection."
Al-Zamakhshari explains Barzakh to mean hā'il, "an obstacle." His adaptation of the meaning of the word coincides with mentions of Barzakh in Quran 25:53.
Abdullah Yusuf Ali referred to a Barzakh state as a "quiescent state." The soul lies in a resting state until Yawm al-Qiyāmah.

Sufism 
In Sufism the Barzakh or Alam-e-Araf is not only where the soul resides after death, but also a place it can visit during sleep and meditation.

Ibn 'Arabi defines Barzakh as the intermediate realm or "isthmus". It is between the World of Corporeal Bodies and the World of Spirits, and is a means of contact between the two worlds. Without it, there would be no contact between the two and both would cease to exist. It is described as simple and luminous, like the World of Spirits, but also able to take on many different forms just like the World of Corporeal Bodies can. In broader terms Barzakh, “is anything that separates two things”. It has been described as the dream world in which the dreamer is in both life and death.

Barzakh can also refer to a person. Chronologically between Jesus and Mohammad is the contested Prophet Khalid. Ibn 'Arabi considers this man to be a “Barzakh” or the Perfect Human Being. Chittick explains that the Perfect Human acts as the Barzakh or "isthmus" between God and the world. Ibn 'Arabi's story of Prophet Khalid is a story of Perfect Human being.

Khalid's story is of a Prophet whose message never emerged because before he died, he told his sons to open his tomb forty days after his death to receive the message of Barzakh. The sons, however, feared they would be looked down upon for opening their dead father's tomb, therefore they decided not to exhume their father. Thus, his message was never shared. An Ottoman scholar explained that for Khalid to give the knowledge of Barzakh he would have to travel through the different worlds and then return, but because he was not exhumed, his message was never heard. Ibn 'Arabi explains that because this mission ended in failure, it does not conflict with The Prophet Mohammed’s statement: “I am nearest of men to Jesus son of Mary, for there is no prophet between him and me."

Shia 
The idea of Barzakh in Shia is significant though in a perspective and manner different from Sufism. The Prophet and Shia Imams, particularly the 6th Imam – Imam Jafar As-Sadiq, have explained through various hadiths the treatment, condition, processes, and other intricate details regarding the passage of Barzakh. In Shia theology, there are seven checkpoints in Barzakh. The first being kindness/trust/wilayah. Second is salaat. Third is zakaat/khums. Fourth is fasting. Fifth is hajj. Sixth is cleanliness. Seventh is rights. It is believed that the terms and conditions to understand Barzakh are limited in scope and full comprehension because it is Shia's belief that it is incomprehensible, to a certain degree, until one actually reaches the realm beyond our physical world. A common analogy used is that of a baby in the womb. Just as the baby cannot possibly begin to understand the vast outside world until they experience it for themselves, we cannot hope to understand what Barzakh entails until we transition there ourselves. Though despite this obstacle, the Shia Imams, as cited through various sayings, have explained Barzakh to a significant degree as compared to other sects within Islam.

Contemporary interpretations and uses 
The term has also found its way into more contemporary, non-religious sectors of life. At least three bands have adopted the name Barzakh, including an Indonesian Jakarta black metal band, a Tunisian oriental metal band and Naqash Ali Shawkat band.  Additionally, Barzakh was used as the title of a 2011 documentary following citizens of a war-torn Chechen community searching for a lost friend who they believe may have transitioned from our physical world to the realm of Barzakh.

Barzakh and Christian purgatory 
According to the belief of some Christians (mostly Catholics), purgatory is an intermediate state after physical death for expiatory purification. This is a temporary place, similar to Barzakh. Because they have this in common, some believe that they are the same idea or concept. Barzakh is actually closer to the idea of limbo, a place that is between life and the true afterlife. In this place, people await their final judgment, much like some definitions of Barzakh. The Quranic idea of aʿrāf (“the heights”) is closer to that of Christian purgatory. Aʿrāf is also thought of as a place where souls go whose good and bad deeds are too evenly matched to go directly to Paradise or the Fire.

See also 
 Araf
 Bardo
 Intermediate state
 Malakut
 Matarta in Mandaeism
 Punishment of the Grave
 Sheol
 Siahat-e Gharb

References 

25. http://www.alim.org/library/quran/AlQuran-tafsir/MDD/47/26

Further reading 
 Archer, George (2017). A Place Between Two Places: The Qurʾānic Barzakh. Gorgias Press: Piscataway, NJ. .
 Corbin, Henry (1977). Spiritual Body and Celestial Earth: From Mazdean Iran to Shi'ite Iran. Princeton University Press.

Islamic eschatology
Afterlife places
Islamic cosmology
Islamic terminology
Limbo